Cooyoo is a primitive ichthyodectid found in Lower Cretaceous strata of Queensland, Australia. As with all other ichthyodectids, it was a predator of smaller fish. The type species, named in 1987, is C. australis, although Arthur Smith Woodward originally named it as a species of Portheus (now a probable synonym of Xiphactinus) in 1894, which was later amended to Xiphactinus.

In February 2023, archaeologists revealed the 2.5- meter long intact fossil of a fish in north-west Queensland. According to Rob Levers, Kronosaurus Korner founder and chairman, it was possible to detect the fish in the stomach of Cooyoo nicnamed "Wanda".

References

Ichthyodectidae
Prehistoric fish of Australia
Fossil taxa described in 1987